Alexander Ferenczy (1895–1931) was a Hungarian art director.

Selected filmography
 Samson and Delilah (1922)
 The Portrait (1923)
 Fadette (1926)
 Attorney for the Heart (1927)
 The Gypsy Baron (1927)
 Modern Pirates (1928)
 Escape from Hell (1928)
 Casanova's Legacy (1928)
 My Sister and I (1929)
 Checkmate (1931)
 Alarm at Midnight (1931)

References

Bibliography
 Tabori, Paul. Alexander Korda. Living Books, 1966.

External links

1895 births
1931 deaths
Hungarian art directors
Film people from Budapest